The Battle of Langemarck (16–18 August 1917) was the second Anglo-French general attack of the Third Battle of Ypres, during the First World War. The battle took place near Ypres in Belgian Flanders, on the Western Front against the German 4th Army. The French First Army had a big success on the northern flank from Bixschoote to Drie Grachten (Three Canals) and the British gained a substantial amount of ground northwards from Langemark to the boundary with the French.

The attack on the Gheluvelt Plateau on the right (southern) flank captured a considerable amount of ground but failed to reach its objectives. German counter-attacks recaptured most of the lost territory during the afternoon. The weather prevented much of the British programme of air co-operation with the infantry, which made it easier for German reserves to assemble on the battlefield.

An unusually large amount of rain in August, poor drainage and lack of evaporation turned the ground into a morass, which was worse for the British and French, who occupied lower-lying ground and attacked areas which had been frequently and severely bombarded. Mud and flooded shell holes severely reduced the mobility of the infantry and poor visibility hampered artillery observers and artillery-observation aircraft. Rainstorms and the costly German defensive success during the rest of August, led the British to stop the offensive for three weeks.

In early September, the sun came out and with the return of a breeze, dried much of the ground. The British rebuilt roads and tracks to the front line, transferred more artillery and fresh divisions from the armies further south and revised further their tactics. The main offensive effort was shifted southwards and led to success on the Gheluvelt Plateau on 20, 26 September and 4 October, before the rains returned.

Background

Strategic background

Artillery preparation for the Second Battle of Verdun, in support of the Allied offensive in Flanders, which had been delayed from mid-July began on 20 August, after an eight-day bombardment. Attacking on an  front, the French captured Mort Homme, Hill 304 and  The 5th Army could not counter-attack because its  divisions had been sent to Flanders. Fighting at Verdun continued into September, adding to the pressure on the German army. The Canadian Corps fought the Battle of Hill 70  outside Lens on the British First Army front. The attack was costly but inflicted great losses on five German divisions and pinned down troops reserved for relief of tired divisions on the Flanders front. The strategy of forcing the German army to defend the Ypres salient, to protect the Belgian hinterland, the coast, railways and submarine bases, had succeeded. The French and Russians could make local attacks but needed more time to recuperate free of big German attacks. The British had forced the Germans into a costly defensive battle but the Fifth Army (General Hubert Gough) had struggled to advance since 31 July, due to the tenacity of the German defence and the unusually wet weather. Gough kept pressure on the 4th Army, to prevent the Germans from recovering and to enable Operation Hush on the coast, which needed the high tides due at the end of August.

Tactical developments

On 31 July 1917, Field Marshal Sir Douglas Haig had begun the Third Battle of Ypres, to inflict unsustainable losses on the German army and to advance out of the Ypres Salient to capture the Belgian coast and end the submarine threat from Belgian bases to the southern North Sea and the Dover Straits. At the Battle of Messines Ridge (7–14 June) the ridge had been captured down to the Oosttaverne line and a substantial success had been gained at the Battle of Pilckem Ridge (31 July – 2 August). Ground conditions in August were poor, as the surface had been bombarded, fought over and partially flooded, at times severely so. Shelling had destroyed drainage canals in the area and the unseasonable heavy rain in August turned parts into morasses of mud and waterlogged shell-craters. Supply troops walked to the front on duck boards laid across the mud; carrying loads of up to  they could slip into the craters and drown. Trees were reduced to blasted trunks, the branches and leaves torn away and corpses from earlier fighting were uncovered by the rain and shelling.

Brigadier-General John Davidson, Director of Operations at BEF HQ, submitted a memorandum on 1 August, urging caution on Haig and Gough. Davidson recommended that the preliminary operation by II Corps not be hurried; a full artillery preparation and a relief by fresh divisions should be completed before the operation. Tired and depleted units had often failed in such attacks; two fresh divisions were sent to II Corps. Two or three clear days were needed for accurate artillery-fire, especially as captured ground on the Gheluvelt plateau gave better observation. Captured German maps revealed the positions of their machine-gun emplacements, which being small and concealed, needed accurate fire by the artillery to destroy them. The capture of the black line, from Inverness Copse north to Westhoek, would be insufficient to protect an advance from the Steenbeek further north and large German counter-attacks could be expected on the plateau, given that it was the German defensive point of main effort.

Weather
Except where shell-holes obstructed drainage, the ground in west Flanders dried quickly and became dusty after a few dry days. A 1989 study of weather data recorded from 1867 to 1916 at Lille,  down the road from Ypres, showed August to be more often dry than wet, that there was a trend towards dry autumns (September–November) and that average rainfall in October had decreased over the previous fifty years. From 1 to 10 August,  of rain fell, including  in a thunderstorm on 8 August. During August 1917,  of rain fell,  of which fell on   The month was so overcast and windless that water on the ground dried slower than usual. September had  of rain and was much sunnier, the ground drying quickly, hard enough in places for shells to ricochet and for dust to blow in the breeze.

Prelude

British offensive preparations

Few of the pillboxes captured on 31 July had been damaged by artillery-fire and before the attack, the 109th Brigade [36th (Ulster) Division] commander, Brigadier-General Ambrose Ricardo, arranged three-minute bombardments on selected pillboxes and blockhouses by the XIX Corps heavy artillery, with pauses so that artillery observers could make corrections to contradictory maps and photographs. It was discovered that on many of the targets, the shell dispersion covered hundreds of yards, as did wire-cutting bombardments. On 2 August, at the suggestion of Brigadier-General Hugh Elles, commander of the Tank Corps, it was decided that the surviving tanks were to be held back due to the weather, for use en masse later on, although some were used later in the month. The preliminary operation intended for 2 August was delayed by rain until 10 August and more rain delays forced the postponement of the general offensive from 4 to 15 August and then again to 16 August.

The 20th (Light) Division replaced the 38th (Welsh) Division on 5 August. The 7th Battalion of the Somerset Light Infantry took over captured German trenches behind the front line on 5 August, which had been turned into the British reserve line and lost three men to shellfire while waiting for dark. On arrival at the support line  forward and the front line another  beyond, the battalion found that the front line consisted of shell hole posts with muddy bottoms strung along the Steenbeek, from the Langemarck road to the Ypres–Staden railway. British artillery was engaged in destructive bombardments of the German positions opposite and German artillery fire was aimed at the British infantry concentrating for the next attack. After heavy rain all night, the battalion spent 6 August soaked through and had  two men being killed. Training began for the next attack, planned from trench maps and aerial photographs. Each company formed three platoons, two for the advance, with two rifle sections in the lead, the Lewis-gun sections behind and the third platoon to mop up.

Training emphasised the need for units to "hug" the creeping barrage and form offensive flanks, to assist neighbouring troops whose advance had been halted by the defenders. Infantry that got forward could provide enfilade fire and envelop German positions, which were to be left behind and mopped-up by reserve platoons. Every known German position was allocated to a unit of the  left in the battalion, to reduce the risk of unseen German positions being overrun and the occupants firing at the leading troops from behind. While the Somersets were out of the line, the 10th and 11th battalions, the Rifle Brigade edged forward about  beyond the Steenbeek, which cost the 10th Battalion  On 15 August an attempt to re-capture the Au Bon Gite blockhouse,  beyond the Steenbeek, which had been lost to a German counter-attack on 31 July, failed. It was decided that the infantry for the general attack, due on 16 August, would have to squeeze into the ground beyond the river in front of the blockhouse for the attack on Langemarck.

Operation Summer Night

The 22nd Reserve Division had been relieved by the 12th Division and the 207th Division after its losses on 31 July. The new German positions were on higher and drier ground and deprived the British of observation over the German rear, reducing casualties from British artillery-fire.

Further to the south, Reserve Infantry regiments  of the 207th Division attacked Hollebeke through thick fog and captured the village, despite many casualties, taking at least  Most of the British were in captured pillboxes and blockhouses, which had to be attacked one by one and at  three signal flares were fired to indicate success. The Germans later abandoned Hollebeke and reoccupied the old A line, then withdrew to their start line because of the severity of British counter-attacks and artillery-fire.  left the front-line ragged, with a  gap between regiments  which the British tried to exploit with attacks and counter-attacks, before the bigger British effort of 10 August against the Gheluvelt Plateau.

Capture of Westhoek

The Gheluvelt Plateau became a sea of mud, flooded shell craters, fallen trees and barbed wire. Troops were exhausted quickly by the weather, massed artillery bombardments and lack of food and water; rapid relief of units spread the exhaustion through all the infantry, despite the front being held by fresh divisions. British artillery fired a preparatory bombardment from Polygon Wood to Langemarck but the German guns concentrated on the Plateau. The British gunners were hampered by low cloud and rain, which made air observation extremely difficult and shells were wasted on empty gun emplacements. The British 25th Division, 18th (Eastern) Division and the German 54th Division had relieved the original divisions by 4 August but the German 52nd Reserve Division was left in the line; by 10 August the infantry on both sides of no man's land were exhausted. The 18th (Eastern) Division attacked on the right; some troops quickly reaching their objectives but German artillery isolated them around Inverness Copse and Glencorse Wood. German troops counter-attacked several times and by nightfall the Copse and all but the north-west corner of Glencorse Wood had been recaptured. The 25th Division on the left flank advanced quickly and reached its objectives by  rushing the Germans in Westhoek. Snipers and attacks by German aircraft caused an increasing number of casualties; the Germans counter-attacked into the night and the British guns bombarded German troops in their assembly positions. The appalling weather and costly defeats began a slump in British infantry morale; lack of replacements began to concern the German commanders.

Plan

The attack was planned as an advance in stages, to keep the infantry well under the protection of the field artillery.

On the 56th (1/1st London) Division front, the final objective was about  into Polygon Wood. On the right, the 53rd Brigade of the 18th (Eastern) Division was to advance from Stirling Castle, through Inverness Copse to Black Watch Corner, at the south-west corner of Polygon Wood, to form a defensive flank to the south. Further north, the 169th Brigade was to advance to Polygon Wood through Glencorse Wood and 167th Brigade was to reach the north-western part of Polygon Wood through Nonne Bosschen.

The 8th Division was to attack with two brigades between Westhoek and the Ypres–Roulers railway, to reach the green line on the rise east of the Hanebeek stream. Eight tanks were allotted to II Corps to assist the infantry. Eight machine-gun companies were to fire barrages on the area from the north-east of Polygon Wood to west of Zonnebeke.

XIX and XVIII corps, further north, were also to capture the green line, slightly beyond the German  (third position). Each XIX Corps division had fourteen  batteries for the creeping barrage,  howitzer batteries and forty machine-guns for standing barrages, along with the normal heavy artillery groups. Each division also had a hundred and eight 18-pounders and  howitzers for bombardment and benefited from supply routes which had been far less heavily shelled than those further south. In the XVIII Corps area, a brigade each from the 48th (South Midland) Division and 11th (Northern) Division with eight tanks each, was to attack from the north end of St Julien to the White House east of Langemarck.

The 20th (Light) Division planned to capture Langemarck with the 60th Brigade and 61st Brigade. The 59th Brigade was to go into reserve after holding the line before the attack, less the two battalions in the front line, which were to screen the assembly of the attacking brigades. The attack was to begin on the east bank of the Steenbeek, where the troops had  of room to assemble, crossing over on wooden bridges laid by the engineers the night before the attack. The first objective (blue line), was set on a road running along the west side of Langemarck, the second objective (green line) was  further on, at the east side of the village and the final objective (red line) was another  ahead, in the German defences beyond Schreiboom. On the right, the 60th Brigade was to attack on a one-battalion front, with two battalions to leapfrog through the leading battalion, to reach the second and final objectives. The manoeuvre of the 60th Brigade would also threaten the Germans in Langemarck with encirclement.

Au Bon Gite, the German blockhouse which had resisted earlier attacks, was to be dealt with by infantry from one of the covering battalions and a Royal Engineer Field Company. Artillery for the attack came from the 20th (Light) Division, 38th (Welsh) Division and the heavy guns of XIV Corps. The first objective was to be bombarded for twenty minutes, as the creeping barrage moved towards it, then the second objective was to be shelled for an hour to catch retreating German soldiers, destroy defences and force any remaining Germans under cover. A third barrage was to come from the XIV Corps heavy artillery, sweeping back and forth with high explosive, from  ahead of the foremost British troops, to stop German machine-gunners in retired positions from firing through the British barrage. Smoke shell was to be fired to hide the attacking troops, as they re-organised at each objective. German troops were also to be strafed by British aircraft from low altitude. The French First Army was to extend the attack north, from the Kortebeek to Drie Grachten, aiming to reach the St Jansbeck.

German defences

The German 4th Army operation order for the defensive battle was issued on 27 June. German infantry units had been reorganised on similar lines to the British, with a rifle section, assault troop section, a grenade-launcher section and a light machine-gun section. Field artillery in the  divisions had been organised into artillery assault groups, which followed the infantry to engage the attackers with observed or direct fire. Each infantry regiment of the 183rd Division, based around Westroosebeke behind the northern flank of Group Ypres, had a battalion of the divisional field artillery regiment attached.

Between the German positions were the Belgian villages of Zonnebeke and Passchendaele. Dispersed in front of the line were divisional sharpshooter machine-gun nests called the strongpoint line.

The  (second position) roughly corresponded to the British black line (second objective) of 31 July, much of which had been captured, except on the Gheluvelt Plateau.

Opposite the French First Army, the Germans had counter-flooded the area between Dixmude and Bixschoote and fortified the drier ground around the waters to stop an attack across or around the floods. Drie Grachten (Three Canals) was the main German defensive fortification in the area, blocking the Noordschoote–Luyghem road at the crossing of the Yperlee Canal north of the Steenbeek. The area was beyond the confluence with the Kortebeek, where the rivers joined to become the St Jansbeek. From Luyghem, a road ran south-east to Verbrandemis and the road from Zudyschoote and Lizenie to Dixmude crossed the Yperlee at Steenstraat. The capture of Luyghem, Merckem and the road would threaten Houthoulst Forest, to the south of Dixmude and north of Langemarck. By 15 August, the French had closed up to Drie Grachten from Bixschoote to the south-east and Noordschoote to the south-west.

West of the Yperlee Canal, the bridgehead consisted of a semi-circular breastwork due to waterlogged soil. Reinforced concrete shelters were connected by a raised trench of concrete, earth and fascines, with a communication trench leading back to a command post. Several hundred yards along a communication trench on the north side of the road was a small blockhouse. Barbed wire entanglements had been laid above and below the water in front of the post and blockhouse astride the Noordschoote–Luyghem road. Platforms gave machine-guns command of a wide arc of ground in front. On the east bank of the Yperlee was a rampart of reinforced concrete, behind and parallel with the canal, from opposite  to the southern redoubt. Communication between the rampart and the defences of the Luyghem peninsula was via the raised road from Drie Grachten to Luyghem and two footbridges through the floods, one north and one south of the road. Every , were traverses with reinforced concrete shelters.

In the Group Ypres area, only the 3rd and 79th Reserve divisions remained battleworthy, the other four having suffered  On 4 August, a  assessment concluded that the British needed to force back the 52nd Division on the Gheluvelt Plateau, where the defensive scheme had the front regiment of each division backed by the other two regiments in support and in reserve behind the front line. Crown Prince Rupprecht expressed concern on 5 August, that the weather conditions were rapidly exhausting the German infantry. Supplying troops in the front line was extremely difficult because the British were using more gas, which caught carrying parties by surprise; the 6th Bavarian Reserve Division had suffered  casualties.

Battle

Fifth Army

II Corps
At  the British creeping barrage began to move and the infantry advanced. German flares were seen rising but the German artillery response was slow and missed the attackers. In the 18th (Eastern) Division area, German machine-gun fire from pillboxes caused many losses to the 53rd Brigade, which was stopped in front of the north-west corner of Inverness Copse. Part of the brigade managed to work forward further north and form a defensive flank along the southern edge of Glencorse Wood. To the north, the 169th Brigade of the 56th (1/1st London) Division advanced quickly at the start but veered to the right around boggy ground, then entered Glencorse Wood. The German main line of resistance was in a sunken road inside the wood, where after a hard-fought and mutually costly engagement, the German defenders were overrun and the rest of the wood occupied. The leading waves then advanced to Polygon Wood.

Another problem emerged, because the quick start had been partly due to the rear waves pushing up to avoid German shelling on the left of the brigade. The follow-up infantry mingled with the foremost troops and failed to mop up the captured ground or German troops who had been overrun. Isolated German parties began sniping from behind at both brigades. Part of one company reached the area north of Polygon Wood at about the same time as small numbers of troops from the 8th Division. The ground conditions in the 56th (1/1st London) Division area were so bad that none of the tanks in support got into action.

On the 8th Division front, the two attacking brigades started well, advancing behind an "admirable" barrage and reached the Hanebeek, where hand bridges were used to cross and continue the advance up Anzac Spur, to the green line objectives on the ridge beyond. Difficulties began on the left flank, where troops from 16th (Irish) Division had not kept up with the 8th Division. After reaching the vicinity of Potsdam Redoubt a little later, the 16th (Irish) Division was held up for the rest of the day. The check to the Irish left German machine-gunners north of the railway free to enfilade the area of 8th Division to the south. On the right flank, the same thing happened to the 56th (1/1st London) Division, which was stopped by fire from German strongpoints and pillboxes in their area and from German artillery concentrated to the south-east. After a long fight, the 8th Division captured Iron Cross, Anzac and Zonnebeke redoubts on the rise beyond the Hanebeek, then sent parties over the ridge.

XIX Corps

The 16th (Irish) Division and 36th (Ulster) Division attacked from north of the Ypres–Roulers railway to just south of St Julien. Providing carrying parties since the last week in July and holding ground from 4 August in the Hanebeek and Steenbeek valleys, which were overlooked by the Germans, had exhausted many men. From 1 to 15 August, the divisions had lost about a third of their front-line strength in casualties. Frequent reliefs during the unexpected delays caused by the rain spread the casualties and fatigue to all of the battalions in both divisions. The advance began on time and after a few hundred yards encountered German strong points, which were found not to have been destroyed by a series of special heavy artillery bombardments before the attack.

The 16th (Irish) Division suffered many casualties from the Germans in Potsdam, Vampire and Borry farms, which had not been properly mopped up, because of the acute the infantry shortage. The garrisons were able to shoot at the advancing Irish troops of the 48th Brigade from behind and only isolated parties of British troops managed to reach their objectives. The 49th Brigade on the left was also held up at Borry Farm, which defeated several costly attacks but the left of the brigade got within  of the top of  The 36th (Ulster) Division also struggled to advance, Gallipoli and Somme farms found to be behind a new wire entanglement, with German machine-guns trained on gaps made by the British bombardment, fire from which stopped the advance of the 108th Brigade. To the north, the 109th Brigade had to get across the swamp astride the Steenbeek. The infantry lost the barrage and machine-gun fire from Pond Farm and Border House forced them to take cover.

XVIII Corps

The capture of St Julien was completed and the infantry consolidated along a line from Border House, to Jew Hill, the gun pits and St Julien. Troops were fired on from Maison du Hibou and Hillock Farm, which was captured soon after, then British troops seen advancing on Springfield Farm disappeared. At  German troops gathered around Triangle Farm and at  made an abortive counter-attack. Another German attack after dark was defeated at the gun pits and at  a German counter-attack from Triangle Farm was repulsed.

The 11th (Northern) Division attacked with one brigade at  The right flank was delayed by machine-gun fire from the 48th (South Midland) Division area and by pillboxes to their front, where the infantry lost the barrage. Supporting troops from the 33rd Brigade were caught by fire from the German pillboxes but reached the Cockcroft, passed beyond and dug in despite fire from Bulow Farm. On the left flank, these battalions reached the Langemarck road, passed Rat House and Pheasant Trench and ended their advance just short of the White House, joining with the right side of the brigade on the Lekkerboterbeek.

XIV Corps

The 20th (Light) Division attacked with two brigades at  The battalions of the right brigade leap-frogged forward on a one-battalion front over the Steenbeek and then advanced in single file, worming round flooded shell craters. Alouette Farm, Langemarck and the first two objective lines were reached easily. At  the advance to the final objective began and immediately encountered machine-gun fire from the Rat House and White House. The left brigade advanced on a two-battalion front and encountered machine-gun fire from the Au Bon Gite blockhouse before it was captured and was then fired on from German blockhouses in front of Langemarck and from the railway station. Once these had been captured, the advance resumed at  despite fire from hidden parties of defenders and reached the final objective at  under fire from the Rat House.

The 29th Division to the north attacked at the same time with two brigades. On the right the first objective was reached quickly and assistance given to the 20th (Light) Division on the right. The Newfoundland Regiment passed through, being held up slightly by marshy conditions and fire from Cannes Farm. The Newfoundlanders continued, reached the third objective and then took Japan House beyond. The left brigade took the first objective easily and then met machine-gun fire from Champeaubert Farm in the French First Army sector and from Montmirail Farm.

The French I Corps, on the northern flank of the Fifth Army, attacked from the army boundary north-west of Weidendreft, south of the hamlet of St Janshoek (Sint Jan), north of Bixschoote and the edge of the floods, to the Noordschoote–Luyghem road, which crossed the Yperlee at Drie Grachten (Three Canals). The German defences were more visible than those opposite the British and being above ground, were easier to destroy. The floods obstructed an attack but made it hard for the Germans to move reserves and the open country made French air observation easier. The I Corps objectives were the Drie Grachten bridgehead and the triangular spit of land between the Lower Steenbeek and the Yperlee (Ypres–Ijzer) Canal. The division on the right flank was to cross the Steenbeek and assist XIV Corps on the right, north-west of Langemarck. French and Belgian air crew flew at a very low altitude to bomb and machine-gun German troops, trains and aerodromes and shot down three German aircraft.

I Corps crossed the Yperlee from the north-west of Bixschoote to north of the Drie Grachten bridge-head and drove the Germans out of part of the swampy Poesele peninsula but numerous pillboxes built in the ruins of farmhouses further back were not captured. The French crossed the upper Steenbeek from west of Weidendreft to a bend in the stream south-west of St Janshoek. Keeping pace with the British, they advanced to the south bank of the Broombeek. The attack failed and the next morning the troops on the army boundary had observation across the narrow Broombeek valley. Apart from resistance at Les Lilas and Mondovi blockhouses, the French had achieved their objectives of 16 August relatively easily. The German garrisons at Champaubert Farm and Brienne House held out until French artillery deluged them with shells, which induced the garrisons to surrender thirty minutes later. The French took more than  numerous guns, trench mortars and machine-guns.

North and north-east of Bixschoote, the ground sloped towards the Steenbeek and was dotted with pillboxes. Just west of the junction of the Broombeek and Steenbeek the Les Lilas and Mondovi blockhouses were in the angle between the streams. The French artillery had bombarded the Drie Grachten bridgehead for several days and reduced it to ruins, the concrete works being easily hit by heavy artillery and on 16 August, the French infantry waded through the floods and occupied the area. On the Poelsele peninsula the German defenders resisted until nightfall before being driven back, as the French closed up to the west bank of the Martjewaart reach of the Steenbeek. North and north-east of Bixschoote, the French reached the west bank of the St Janshoek reach and surrounded Les Lilas.

On 17 August, French heavy howitzers battered Les Lilas and Mondovi blockhouses all day and by nightfall both strong points had been breached and the garrisons captured. From the southern edge of the inundations between Dixmude and Drie Grachten, the French line had been pushed forward to the west bank of the Steenbeek as far as the south end of St Janshoek. South of Mondovi blockhouse, the Steenbeek had been crossed and on the extreme right, the  had swung northwards to the south bank of the Broombeek, eliminating the possibility of the Fifth Army being outflanked from the north. French engineers had worked in the swamps and morasses to repair roads, bridge streams and build wire entanglements, despite constant German artillery fire.

Air operations

Mist and cloud made air observation difficult on the morning of 16 August, until a wind began to blow later in the day but this shifted the smoke of battle over the German lines, obscuring German troop movements. Corps squadrons were expected to provide artillery co-operation, contact and counter-attack patrols but low cloud, mist and smoke during the morning resulted in most German counter-attack formations moving unnoticed. Flash spotting to find the positions of German artillery was much more successful than in previous attacks and many more flares were lit by the infantry when called for by the crews of contact aeroplanes. Army squadrons, Royal Naval Air Service (RNAS) and French aircraft flew over the lines and attacked German aerodromes, troops and transport as far as the weather allowed. V Brigade RFC tried to co-ordinate air operations over the battlefield with the infantry attack. Two Airco DH.5 aircraft per division were provided to engage any German strong points interfering with the infantry attack on the final objective. Two small formations of fighters were to fly low patrols on the far side of the final objective of the Fifth Army, from the beginning of the attack for six hours, to break up German attempts to counter-attack and to stop equivalent German contact-patrols.

After six hours, the aircraft on low patrol were to range further east to attack troop concentrations. Aircraft from the corps and army wings were to attack all targets found west of Staden–Dadizeele, with the Ninth (Headquarters) Wing taking over east of the line. German aerodromes were attacked periodically and special ground patrols were mounted below  over the front line, to defend the corps artillery-observation machines. Attempts to co-ordinate air and ground attacks had mixed results; on the II Corps front, few air attacks were co-ordinated with the infantry and only a vague report was received from an aircraft about a German counter-attack, which was further obscured by a smoke-screen. To the north on the XVIII and XIV Corps fronts, the air effort had more effect, with German strong-points and infantry being attacked on and behind the front. Air operations continued during the night, with more attacks on German airfields and rail junctions.

German 4th Army

The troops of 169th Brigade, 56th (1/1st London) Division, which tried to follow the leading waves from Glencorse Wood, were stopped at the edge of Polygon Wood and then pushed back by a counter-attack by the German 34th Division around  the troops ahead of them being overwhelmed. Later in the afternoon, the brigade was driven back to its start line by attacks from the south and east by a regiment of the 54th Division sent back into the line. The 167th Brigade pulled back its right flank as the 169th Brigade was seen withdrawing through Glencorse Wood and at  the Germans attacked the front of 167th Brigade and the 25th Brigade of the 8th Division to the north. The area was under British artillery observation and the German attack was stopped by massed artillery fire. At  the brigade withdrew to a better position  in front of its start line to gain touch with 25th Brigade. German artillery fired continuously on a line from Stirling Castle to Westhoek and increased the rate of bombardment from noon, which isolated the attacking British battalions from reinforcements and supplies and prepared the counter-attack made in the afternoon.

As the German counter-attacks by the 34th Division on the 56th (1/1st London) Division gained ground, the 8th Division to the north, about  ahead of the divisions on the flanks, found itself enfiladed as predicted by Heneker. At about  reinforcements for Reserve Infantry Regiment 27 of the 54th Division from Infantry Regiment 34 of the 3rd Reserve Division, the local  division, attacked over Anzac Farm Spur. SOS calls from the British infantry were not seen by their artillery observers, due to low cloud and smoke shell being fired by the Germans into their creeping barrage. An observation report from one British aircraft, failed to give enough information to help the artillery, which did not fire until too late at  The German counter-attack pressed the right flank of the 25th Brigade, which was being fired on from recaptured positions in Nonne Bosschen and forced it back, exposing the right of the 23rd Brigade to the north, which was already under pressure on its left flank and which retired slowly to the Hanebeek stream. The Germans "dribbled" forward and gradually pressed the British infantry back to the foot of Westhoek Ridge. That evening both brigades of the 8th Division withdrew from German enfilade fire coming from the area of the 56th (1/1st London) Division, to ground just forward of their start line.

At around  the 16th (Irish) and 36th (Ulster) Divisions were counter-attacked by the reserve regiment of the 5th Bavarian Division, supported by part of the 12th Reserve Division behind a huge barrage, including smoke shell to mask the attack from British artillery observers. Despite "ideal" weather, air observation failed as it did on the II Corps front. The forward elements of both divisions were overrun and killed or captured. By  the corps commander, Lieutenant-General Herbert Watts, had brought the barrage back to the start-line, regardless of survivors holding out beyond it. At  Gough ordered that a line from Borry Farm to Hill 35 and Hindu Cottage be taken to link with XVIII Corps. After consulting the divisional commanders, Watts reported that a renewed attack was impossible, since the reserve brigades were already holding the start line.

There were few German counter-attacks on the fronts of XVIII and XIV Corps, which had also not been subjected to much artillery fire before the attack, as the Germans had concentrated on the corps further south. Despite the "worst going" in the salient, the 48th (South Midland) Division got forward on its left, against fire from the area not occupied by 36th (Ulster) Division on its right; the 11th (Northern) Division advanced beyond Langemarck. The 20th (Light) division and the 29th Division of XIV Corps and the French further north reached most of their objectives without serious counter-attack but the Germans subjected the new positions to intense artillery fire, inflicting many losses for several days, especially on the 20th (Light) Division. The German army group commander, Crown Prince Rupprecht wrote that the German defence continued to be based on holding the Gheluvelt Plateau and Houthoulst Forest as bastions, British advances in between were not serious threats. Ludendorff was less sanguine, writing that 10 August was a German success but that the British attack on 16 August was another great blow. Poelcappelle had been reached and despite a great effort, the British could only be pushed back a short distance.

Aftermath

Analysis

The British plan to overcome the German deep battlefield, was based on a conventional attack in three stages but the artillery was able to arrange a fire plan which was far more sophisticated than in previous attacks. The creeping barrage preceded the infantry and in some places moved slowly enough for the infantry to keep up. New smoke shells were fired when the creeping barrage paused beyond each objective, which helped to obscure the British infantry from artillery observers and German machine-gunners far back in the German defensive zone, who fired at long range through the British artillery barrages. Around Langemarck the British infantry formed up close the German positions, too near to the German defenders for the German artillery to fire on for fear of hitting their infantry, although British troops further back at the Steenbeek were severely bombarded. British platoons and sections were allotted objectives and engineers accompanied troops to bridge obstacles and attack strong points. In the 20th (Light) Division, each company was reduced to three platoons, two to advance using infiltration tactics and one to mop up areas where the forward platoons had by-passed resistance, by attacking from the flanks and from behind.

In the II and XIX Corps areas, the foremost British infantry had been isolated by German artillery and then driven back by counter-attacks. At a conference with the Fifth Army corps commanders on 17 August, Gough arranged for local attacks to gain jumping-off positions for a general attack on 25 August. Apart from small areas on the left of the 56th (1/1st London) Division (Major-General Frederick Dudgeon), the flanks of the 8th Division and right of the 16th (Irish) Division, the British had been forced back to their start line by German machine-gun fire from the flanks and infantry counter-attacks supported by plentiful artillery. Attempts by the German infantry to advance further were stopped by British artillery-fire, which inflicted many losses. Dudgeon reported that there had been a lack of time to prepare the attack and study the ground, since the 167th Brigade had relieved part of the 25th Division after it had only been in the line for  neither unit had sufficient time to make preparations for the attack. Dudgeon also reported that no tracks had been laid beyond Château Wood, that the wet ground had slowed the delivery of supplies to the front line and obstructed the advance beyond it. Pillboxes had caused more delays and subjected the attacking troops to frequent enfilade fire.

Major-General Oliver Nugent, the commander of the 36th (Ulster) Division, had used information from captured German orders and noted that German artillery could not bombard advancing British troops since German positions were distributed in depth and the forward zone was easily penetrated. The advance of supporting troops was much easier to obstruct but it was more important to help the foremost infantry. If counter-battery fire was insufficient, the covering fire in front of the advance was more important and counter-battery groups should change target. Nugent recommended that fewer field guns be used for the creeping barrage and that surplus guns should be grouped to fire sweeping barrages (from side-to-side) and that Shrapnel shells should be fuzed to burst higher up, to hit the inside of shell holes. Creeping barrages should be slower with more frequent and longer pauses, during which the barrages from field artillery and 60-pounder guns should sweep and search (move side-to-side and back-and-forth). Nugent suggested that infantry formations should change from skirmish lines to company columns on narrow fronts, equipped with a machine-gun and Stokes mortar and move within a zone, since lines broke up under machine-gun fire in crater-fields.

Tanks to help capture pillboxes had bogged down behind the British front-line and air support had been restricted by the weather, particularly by low cloud early on and by sending too few aircraft over the battlefield. Only one aircraft per corps was reserved for counter-attack patrol, with two aircraft per division for ground attack. Only eight aircraft covered the army front to engage German infantry as they counter-attacked. Signalling had failed at vital moments and deprived the infantry of artillery support, which had made the German counter-attacks much more formidable in areas where the Germans had artillery observation. The 56th (1/1st London Division) Division recommended that advances be shortened, to give more time for consolidation and to minimise the organisational and communication difficulties caused by the muddy ground and wet weather. Divisional artillery commanders asked for two aircraft per division, exclusively to conduct counter-attack patrols. With observation from higher ground to the east, German artillery-fire inflicted many casualties on the British troops holding the new line beyond Langemarck.  

The success of the German 4th Army in preventing the Fifth Army from advancing far along the Gheluvelt Plateau, led Haig to reinforce the offensive in the south-east, along the southern side of Passchendaele Ridge. Haig transferred principal authority for the offensive to the Second Army (General Herbert Plumer) on 25 August. Like Gough after 31 July, Plumer planned to launch a series of attacks with even more limited geographical objectives, using the extra heavy artillery brought in from the armies further south, to deepen and increase the weight of the creeping barrage. Plumer intended to ensure that the infantry were organised on tactically advantageous ground and in contact with their artillery, when they received German counter-attacks. Minor operations by both sides continued in September along the Second and Fifth army fronts, the boundary of which had been moved northwards, close to the Ypres–Roulers railway at the end of August.

Casualties
The British official historian, James Edmonds, recorded  British casualties for  August, of whom  been killed, with a claim that 37 German divisions had been exhausted and withdrawn. Calculations of German losses by Edmonds have been severely criticised ever since. By mid-August the German army had mixed views on the course of events. The defensive successes were a source of satisfaction but the cost in casualties was thought unsustainable. The German Official History recorded  from 11 to 21 August, including   and  guns lost. Rain, huge artillery bombardments and British air attacks greatly strained the fighting power of the remaining German troops. In 1931, Hubert Gough wrote that  and eight guns had been captured.

Subsequent operations

Gough called a conference for 17 August and asked for proposals on what to do next from the corps commanders. Jacob (II Corps) wanted to attack the brown line and then the yellow line, Watts (XIX Corps) wanted to attack the purple line but Maxse (XVIII Corps) preferred to attack the dotted purple line, ready to attack the yellow line with XIX Corps. Gough decided to attack in different places at different times, risking defeat in detail. Infantry tactics would be irrelevant if the artillery failed to suppress the German defenders as the infantry struggled through mud and waterlogged shell-holes.

On 17 August, a 48th (South Midland) Division (XVIII Corps) attack on Maison du Hibou failed; next day the 14th (Light) Division (II Corps) attacked with a brigade through Inverness Copse, although held up further north by fire from Fitzclarence and L-shaped farms. A German counter-attack forced the British half way back through the copse; with support from two tanks on the Menin Road, the British held on there, despite three more German attacks. In the XIV Corps area, the 86th Brigade of the 29th Division pushed forward and established nine posts over the Broombeek.

Action of the Cockcroft

On 19 August parties from the 48th (South Midland) Division (XVIII Corps) and a composite company of the 1st Tank Brigade, attacked up the St Julien–Poelcappelle road to capture the fortified farms, blockhouses and pillboxes known as Hillock Farm, Triangle Farm, Maison du Hibou, the Cockcroft, Winnipeg Cemetery, Springfield and Vancouver. The advance was covered by a smoke barrage and low-flying aircraft disguised the sound of the tanks. The infantry followed up when the tank crews signalled and occupied the strong points. Triangle Farm was overrun soon afterwards, when tanks drove the garrisons under cover from where they were unable to defend themselves.

A Female tank ditched  from the Cockcroft at  the crew dismounted their Lewis guns and dug in to wait for their infantry party. On 20 August, a special gas and smoke bombardment was fired by the British on Jehu Trench, beyond Lower Star Post, on the front of the 24th Division (II Corps). The 61st (2nd South Midland) Division (XIX Corps) took a German outpost near Somme Farm and on 21 August the 38th (Welsh) Division (XIV Corps), pushed forward its left flank.

Notes

Footnotes

References

Books
 
 
 
 
 
 
 
 
 
 
 
 
 
 
 
 
 
 
 
 
 
 
 
 
 

Encyclopaedias
 

Journals

Further reading

External links

 Order of Battle – France and Flanders 1917, Battle # 98 – Order of Battle for the Battle of Langemarck

Conflicts in 1917
1917 in Belgium
Battles of the Western Front (World War I)
Ypres Salient
Battles of World War I involving Germany
Battle honours of the Rifle Brigade
Battle honours of the King's Royal Rifle Corps
Battles of World War I involving the United Kingdom
Battles of World War I involving Australia
Battles of World War I involving New Zealand
Battles of World War I involving France
Battle of Passchendaele
1917 in France
August 1917 events